Medina collaris is a species of fly in the family Tachinidae.

Distribution
Palearctic.

References

Diptera of Asia
Diptera of Europe
Exoristinae
Insects described in 1820
Taxa named by Carl Fredrik Fallén